Oscar and Benny is a 1998 album by Oscar Peterson and Benny Green. Peterson and Green are accompanied by Ray Brown on double bass, and the drummer Gregory Hutchinson.

Track listing
 "For All We Know" (J. Fred Coots, Sam M. Lewis) – 5:38
 "When Lights Are Low" (Benny Carter, Spencer Williams) – 6:50
 "Yours Is My Heart Alone" (Franz Lehár, Beda Fritz Loehner) – 5:14
 "Here's That Rainy Day" (Johnny Burke, Jimmy Van Heusen) – 6:36
 "The More I See You" (Mack Gordon, Harry Warren) – 5:39
 "Limehouse Blues" (Philip Braham, Douglas Furber) – 4:18
 "Easy Does It" (Sy Oliver, Trummy Young) – 7:31
 "Someday My Prince Will Come" (Frank Churchill, Larry Morey) – 5:31
 "Scrapple from the Apple" (Charlie Parker) – 5:45
 "Jitterbug Waltz" (Richard Maltby, Jr., Fats Waller) – 6:51
 "Barbara's Blues" (Oscar Peterson) – 8:18

Personnel
 Oscar Peterson – piano
 Benny Green – piano
 Ray Brown – double bass
 Gregory Hutchinson – drums

References

1998 albums
Benny Green (pianist) albums
Oscar Peterson albums
Telarc Records albums